The Women's National Basketball Association's (WNBA) assists leader is the player with the highest assists per game average in a given season.

Ticha Penicheiro has had the most league-leading seasons, with seven. The five highest single-season averages were recorded by Courtney Vandersloot, who set new records in each of four consecutive seasons from 2017 to 2020.

Assists leader

See also
 WNBA Peak Performers

External links 
 WNBA Year-by-Year Leaders and Records for Assists Per Game by Basketball-Reference.com

Lists of Women's National Basketball Association players
Women's National Basketball Association statistics